Xebat is a daily Kurdish newspaper published in Iraq by the Kurdistan Democratic Party.

See also
Newspapers in Iraq
Media of Iraq

References 

Newspapers published in Iraq
Kurdish-language newspapers